A  (Old Norse) or  (Old English) was a type of altar or cult site, possibly consisting of a heap of stones, used in Norse religion, as opposed to a roofed hall used as a hof (temple).

The Old Norse term is attested in both the Poetic Edda and the Prose Edda, in the sagas of Icelanders, skaldic poetry, and with its Old English cognate in  Beowulf. The word is also reflected in various place names (in English placenames as harrow), often in connection with Germanic deities.

Etymology
Old Norse hǫrgr means "altar, sanctuary", while Old English hearg refers to a "holy grove; temple, idol". From these, and the Old High German cognate harug, Proto-Germanic *harugaz has been reconstructed, possibly cognate with Insular Celtic carrac "cliff".

Old Norse tradition

Literary
The term hörgr is used three times in poems collected in the Poetic Edda. In a stanza early in the poem Völuspá, the völva says that early in the mythological timeline, the gods met together at the location of Iðavöllr and constructed a hörgr and a hof (Henry Adams Bellows and Ursula Dronke here gloss hörgr as "temples"):

In the poem Vafþrúðnismál Gagnráðr (the god Odin in disguise) engages in a game of wits with the jötunn Vafþrúðnir. Gagnráðr asks Vafþrúðnir whence the Van god Njörðr came, for though he rules over many hofs and hörgar, Njörðr was not raised among the Æsir (Benjamin Thorpe here glosses hörgr with "offer-steads" and Bellows glosses with "shrines"):

In the poem Hyndluljóð, the goddess Freyja speaks favorably of Óttar for having worshiped her so faithfully by using a hörgr. Freyja details that the hörgr is constructed of a heap of stones, and that Óttar very commonly reddened these stones with sacrificial blood (Thorpe glosses hörgr with "offer-stead", Bellows with "shrine", and Orchard with "altar"):

Epigraphic
The place name Salhøgum, that is mentioned on a 9th-century Danish runestone known as the Snoldelev Stone, has a literal translation which combines Old Norse sal meaning "hall" with hörgar "mounds," to form "on the hall mounds," suggesting a place with a room where official meetings took place. The inscription states that the man Gunnvaldr is the þulaR of Salhøgum, which has been identified as referring to the modern town Salløv, located in the vicinity of the original site of the runestone.

Toponymy
Many place names in Iceland and Scandinavia contain the word hörgr or hörgur, such as Hörgá and Hörgsdalur in Iceland and Harg in Sweden. When Willibrord Christianized the Netherlands (~700 AD) the church of Vlaardingen had a dependency in Harago/Hargan, currently named Harga. This indicates that near those places there was some kind of religious building in medieval times.

Old English tradition
In the interpretation of Wilson, Anglo-Saxon Paganism (1992), 
hearg refers to "a special type of religious site, one 
that occupied a prominent position on high land and was a communal place of  worship for a specific group of people, a tribe or folk group, perhaps at particular times of the year", while 
a weoh, by contrast, was merely a small shrine by the wayside.

Beowulf has the compound hærgtrafum in the so-called "Christian excursus" (lines 175–178a), translated as "tabernacles of idols" by Hall (1950).

Following the regular evolution of English phonology, Old English hearg has become harrow in modern English placenames (unrelated to the homophone harrow "agricultural implement").
The London Borough of Harrow derives its name from a temple on Harrow Hill, where St. Mary's Church stands today. 
The name of Harrow on the Hill (Harewe atte Hulle) was adopted into Latin as Herga super montem; the Latinized form of the Old English name is preserved in the name of Herga Road in Harrow.

Notes

References

 Bellows, Henry Adams (Trans.) (1936). The Poetic Edda. Princeton University Press. New York: The American-Scandinavian Foundation.
 Bellows, Henry Adams (Trans.) (1923). The Poetic Edda. American-Scandinavian Foundation.
 Dronke, Ursula (Trans.) (1997). The Poetic Edda: Volume II: Mythological Poems. Oxford University Press. 
 Kvaran, Guðrún (May 29, 2006). "Hvað þýðir orðið hörgur?." Vísindavefurinn.
 Orchard, Andy (1997). Dictionary of Norse Myth and Legend. Cassell. 
 Peterson, Lena (2002). Nordisk runnamslexikon. Swedish Institute for Linguistics and Heritage (Institutet för språk och folkminnen).
 Simek, Rudolf (2007) translated by Angela Hall. Dictionary of Northern Mythology. D.S. Brewer. 
 
 Thorpe, Benjamin (Trans.) (1866). Edda Sæmundar Hinns Frôða: The Edda of Sæmund the Learned. Part I. London: Trübner & Co.

Altars
Germanic paganism
Norse mythology